Scott Jacoby may refer to:

 Scott Jacoby (producer) (born 1971), American record producer
 Scott Jacoby (actor) (born 1956), American actor